Moorefield is an unincorporated community in Pleasant Township, Switzerland County, in the U.S. state of Indiana.

History
Moorefield was platted in 1834. A post office was established at Moorefield in 1838, and remained in operation until it was discontinued in 1916.

Geography

References

Unincorporated communities in Switzerland County, Indiana
Unincorporated communities in Indiana